Efklidi is an under-construction metro station serving Thessaloniki Metro's Line 1 and Line 2. The station is named after the ancient Greek mathematician Euclid and the neighboring homonymous technical school (Katsimidi and Papanastasiou streets).  It is expected to enter service in 2023.

This station also appears in the 1988 Thessaloniki Metro proposal, under the name Archaeological Museum.

References

See also
List of Thessaloniki Metro stations

Thessaloniki Metro